The Women's Economic Opportunity Index is an index compiled by the Economist Intelligence Unit that measures the enabling environment for women's economic participation in 128 countries.  The Economist Intelligence Unit's Women's Economic Opportunity Index is based on 29 indicators that measure a country's laws, regulations, practices, customs and attitudes that allow women to participate in the workforce under conditions roughly equal to those of men, whether as wage-earning employees or as owners of a business. The index was first produced in 2010, with an updated index produced in 2012.  Three indicators were added and 15 new countries were assessed in the 2012 version of the Index.

According to the latest issue of the Index, for 2012 Norway and Sweden kept their top positions from 2010 with scores of 90.4 and 88.3, respectively. Chad and Sudan remained at the bottom of the index with scores of 23.3 and 19.2, respectively. Countries that had the most changes from the 2010 index included Kenya, which went from 90th place to 86th place. The Index suggests that this change occurred because the Kenyan government enacted new policies mandating equal pay for equal work, and made sexual harassment in the workplace illegal. Thailand moved up one place from 2010 to 2012; the index claimed that Thai women gained greater support for business skills training more than any of their regional counterparts. Saudi Arabia's score increased from 35.9 in 2010 to 39.7 in 2012 mainly due to a ministerial order that included equal remuneration for men and women.

In 2019, the index was superseded by the World Bank's Women, Business and the Law index.

Methodology 

The Women's Economic Opportunity Index uses a quantitative and qualitative scoring model, constructed from 29 indicators, measuring specific attributes of the environment for women employees and entrepreneurs in 128 economies. Five category scores are calculated from the unweighted mean of underlying indicators and scaled from 0-100, where 100=most favourable. These categories are: Labour policy and practice (which comprises two sub-categories: Labour policy and Labour practice); Access to finance; Education and training; Women's legal and social status; and the General business environment. Each category or sub-category features several underlying indicators. The overall score (from 0-100) is calculated from an average of the unweighted category and indicator scores.

Data for the quantitative indicators are drawn from national and international statistical sources. Some qualitative indicators were created by the Economist Intelligence Unit, based on legal documents and texts; others have been drawn from a range of surveys and data sources and adjusted by the Economist Intelligence Unit.

The sources used in the Women's Economic Opportunity Index are the Economist Intelligence Unit; the International Labour Organization (ILO); the World Bank Group; the International Monetary Fund; the Organisation for Economic Co-operation and Development (OECD); the United Nations Educational, Scientific and Cultural Organization (UNESCO); the United Nations Development Programme (UNDP); the United Nations Department of Economic and Social Affairs, Population Division; the UN Secretary-General’s database on violence against women; the International Telecommunication Union (ITU); Social Security Online; the Consultative Group to Assist the Poor (CGAP); the World Economic Forum; the World Health Organization; Worldwide Governance Indicators; Freedom House; Vision of Humanity; and national statistical offices.

2012 rankings

See also 

Gender-related Development Index
Gender Empowerment Measure
Human development (humanity)
Human Development Index
Democracy Index

References

External links 
Women's Economic Opportunity Index 2012
http://www.theatlantic.com/business/archive/2012/03/women-rule-the-awesome-worldwide-rise-of-female-workers/254063/
https://www.economist.com/blogs/graphicdetail/2012/03/economic-opportunity-women
http://blogs.ft.com/beyond-brics/2012/03/09/chart-of-the-week-why-are-there-more-em-women-executives/#axzz1pYduQ7qZ
http://spyghana.com/business-news/ghana-improves-ranks-91st-on-2012-global-womens-economic-opportunity-index/
http://www.trust.org/trustlaw/blogs/the-word-on-women/indias-incredible-gender-gap
Global-competitiveness World Economic Forum index

2010 introductions
Economic indicators
International rankings
The Economist